John Ebden (1516 - 1614) was  an English priest.

Ebden was educated at Peterhouse, Cambridge, where he was a Fellow from 1547 until 1554. He was ordained a priest in 1560. He was Archdeacon of Durham from  1560 until 1563; and Archdeacon of Winchester from 1572 until his resignation in 1575.

Notes

1516 births
Archdeacons of Durham
1614 deaths
Archdeacons of Winchester (ancient)
Alumni of Peterhouse, Cambridge
Fellows of Peterhouse, Cambridge